The Lancashire and Yorkshire Railway (L&YR) operated two classes of twenty steam railmotors in total.

Kerr Stuart railmotors 
The first L&YR railmotors were two by Kerr Stuart, copies of a design that had already been supplied to the Taff Vale Railway. They were ordered by Hughes in 1904.

The locomotive units had transverse boilers of a type similar to the Yorkshire steam wagon, where a single central firebox fed extremely short fire-tubes to a smokebox at each side. Like the Yorkshire, these then returned to a central smokebox and chimney. The outside cylinders were rear-mounted and drove only the leading axle, without coupling rods. The locomotive units were dispatched separately to Newton Heath, where their semi-trailers were attached.

Their coaches were semi-trailers, with reversible seats for 48 passengers and electric lighting. There were also a luggage compartment and a driving compartment for use in reverse. Folding steps were provided at each of the two doors on each side. They were built by Bristol Wagon & Carriage Works

Service 
Both railmotors worked the Bury-Holcombe Brook line at first. In 1906 they briefly worked at Southport, then between Burnley and Colne for their remaining years. They were both withdrawn in 1909.

Hughes railmotors 

Hughes designed a further class of railmotors that were then built at Horwich and Newton Heath, in four batches over five years. They were of the "0-4-0T locomotive + semi-trailer type", with conventional locomotive boilers.

No 15, works number 983, was the 1,000th locomotive to be built at Horwich.

Service 
All were inherited by the London, Midland and Scottish Railway (LMS) in 1923, who numbered the locomotives 10600-17 and gave the trailers separate numbers in the coaching stock series.  These were the only self-propelled vehicles numbered in the LMS locomotive series rather than the coaching stock series.  The first was withdrawn in 1927, and only one survived by nationalisation in 1948.  That railmotor, LMS No. 10617, was withdrawn in 1948 without being given a British Railways number.  None was preserved.

The best-remembered of these railmotors was the 'Altcar Bob' service from Southport to Barton railway station (also known as 'Downholland')  (before 1926, it ran to ) and the 'Horwich Jerk' service from Horwich to Blackrod. The latter became the last part of the L&Y System which made use of Hughes Railmotors.

See also 
 Kerr Stuart steam railmotor

Notes and references

Notes

References

Further reading 
 Essery and Jenkinson An Illustrated History of LMS Locomotives Volume 2. Absorbed Pre-Group Classes Western and Central Divisions.

Railmotors
0-2-2T locomotives
Railmotors
British steam railcars
Scrapped locomotives